Vivo is the first live album, It was released on October 5, 1999 by Guatemalan singer-songwriter Ricardo Arjona.

Track listing
 Aquí Estoy
 Ella y Él / Historia de Taxi
 Quién Diría
 Se Nos Muere El Amor
 Realmente No Estoy Tan Solo
 Si El Norte Fuera El Sur
 Historia
 Señora de Las Cuatro Décadas
 Desde La Calle 33
 Tarde (Sin Daños a Terceros)
 Me Enseñaste
 Tu Reputación
 Te Conozco
 Dime Que No
 Mujeres
 Desnuda

Sales and certifications

References

External links
 http://www.ricardoarjona.com/

1999 live albums
Ricardo Arjona live albums
Sony Discos live albums
Spanish-language live albums